The following are people who were either born, raised, or have lived for a significant period of time in the U.S. state of Missouri.

Art and literature

 Helen Andelin (1920–2009), author of Fascinating Womanhood
 Maya Angelou (1928–2014), author and poet
 Thomas P. Barnett (1870–1929), architect and impressionist painter
 Thomas Hart Benton (1889–1975), painter
 George Caleb Bingham (1811–1879), artist (born in Virginia but moved to central Missouri)
 Edward McKendree Bounds (1835–1913), author and theologian
 Mark Bowden (born 1951), author, journalist
 William S. Burroughs (1914–1997), author (Naked Lunch)
 Kate Chopin (1851–1904), author (The Awakening) and early feminist
 Guy Anthony De Marco (born 1963), author of speculative fiction
 Lester Dent (1904–1959), author of Doc Savage novels
 Michele Dunaway (born 1965), author of romantic novels
 Suzette Haden Elgin (1936–2015), science-fiction author and linguist
 T. S. Eliot (1888–1965), poet, dramatist and literary critic
 Mary Engelbreit (born 1952), graphic artist, children's book illustrator
 Michael Evans (1944–2005), photographer
 Eugene Field (1850–1895), writer and poet
 Gillian Flynn (born 1971), novelist, television critic
 Martha Gellhorn (1908–1998), novelist, travel writer and journalist
 Steve Gerber (1947–2008), comic book writer and co-creator of Howard the Duck
 David L. Harrison (born 1937), children's author, poet, recipient of the Missourian Award (2006)
 William Least Heat-Moon (born 1939), author
 Robert A. Heinlein (1907–1988), science fiction author
 Frederick Hibbard (1881–1950), sculptor known for his works of famous 19th-century figures
 Langston Hughes (1902–1967), African-American poet, novelist and playwright
 William W. Johnstone (1938–2004), author of western, horror and survivalist novels
 Donald Judd (1928–1994), artist
 Jim Lee (born 1964), comic book artist and writer
 David Limbaugh (born 1952), columnist, author, political commentator
 Bernarr Macfadden (1868–1955), founder of Macfadden Publications, bodybuilding advocate
 Cornelia F. Maury (1866–1942), pastel artist
 Dennis L. McKiernan (born 1932), author
 Marianne Moore (1887–1972), poet and writer
 Archie Musick (1902–1978), painter and illustrator, associated with the Regionalist movement
 John R. Musick (1849–1901), author and poet, known for the Columbian Historical novels
 Ruth Ann Musick (1897–1974), author and folklorist
 H. Richard Niebuhr (1894–1962), author, theologian
 Reinhold Niebuhr (1892–1971), author, theologian, political commentator
 Isabel Richey (1858–1910), writer, poet
 John Ross (born 1957), author
 Charles Marion Russell (1864–1926), artist
 Clay Shirky (born 1964), writer, consultant, lecturer, author of Here Comes Everybody
 Kimora Lee Simmons (born 1975), fashion model, author, actress
 Minnetta Theodora Taylor (1860–1911), poet, lyricist, writer	
 Sara Teasdale (1884–1933), poet
 Kay Thompson (1909–1998), creator of Eloise children's books
 Ernest Trova (1927–2009), sculptor, surrealist and pop art painter best known for The Falling Man
 Margaret Truman (1924–2008), novelist and non-fiction author
 Mark Twain (1835–1910), born Samuel Clemens, iconic humorist, author and creator of Huckleberry Finn and Tom Sawyer
 Rosa Kershaw Walker (1840s-1909), author, journalist, newspaper editor
 Laura Ingalls Wilder (1867–1957), writer and author of Little House series
 Tennessee Williams (1911–1983), playwright (born in Mississippi, grew up in St. Louis)
 Bertha M. Wilson (1874–1936), dramatist
 Daniel Woodrell (born 1953), author of crime fiction

Sportspeople

Auto racing

Paul Dana (1975–2006), IndyCar Series driver
Lloyd Dane (1925–2015), NASCAR driver
Russ Dugger (born 1975), NASCAR driver, Camping World Truck Series
Carl Edwards (born 1979), NASCAR driver, 2007 NASCAR Busch Series champion
James Ince (born c. 1969), NASCAR crew chief
Justin Jennings (born 1992), NASCAR driver
Cody Lane (born 1996), NASCAR driver, Camping World Truck Series
Justin Marks (born 1981), NASCAR driver
Jamie McMurray (born 1976), NASCAR driver, Daytona 500 winner
Larry Phillips (1942–2004), NASCAR driver
Tony Roper (1964–2000), NASCAR driver
Ken Schrader (born 1955), NASCAR driver
Dorsey Schroeder (born 1953), retired NASCAR driver, Speed Channel color analyst
Ramo Stott (born 1934), retired NASCAR driver
Chrissy Wallace (born 1988), NASCAR driver
Kenny Wallace (born 1963), NASCAR driver, broadcaster
Mike Wallace (born 1959), NASCAR driver
Rusty Wallace (born 1956), NASCAR driver, 1989 NASCAR Winston Cup champion

Baseball

A–M

Bob Allison (1934–1995), MLB outfielder, 3-time All-Star
Jake Arrieta (born 1986), Chicago Cubs pitcher, Cy Young Award winner
Alan Ashby (born 1951), MLB catcher, commentator
George Baker (1857–1915), MLB catcher
Jake Beckley (1867–1919), infielder in Hall of Fame
James "Cool Papa" Bell (1903–1991), Baseball Hall of Fame center fielder
Yogi Berra (1925–2015), Hall of Fame catcher, manager, aphorist
Ken Berry (born 1941), MLB outfielder
Brian Boehringer (born 1969), MLB pitcher
Clete Boyer (1937–2007), MLB third baseman, 2-time World Series winner
Ken Boyer (1931–1982), MLB third baseman, 11-time All-Star, coach and manager
Jack Brennan (1862–1914), MLB catcher
Harry Bright (1929–2000), MLB infielder
Mark Buehrle (born 1979), MLB pitcher, 5-time All-Star
Bobby Byrne (1884–1964), MLB infielder
Scott Carroll (born 1984), MLB relief pitcher
Nate Colbert (born 1946), MLB first baseman, 3-time All-Star
David Cone (born 1963), Cy Young-winning MLB pitcher
Joe Crede (born 1978), MLB third baseman
Bob Dernier (born 1957), MLB outfielder
Ross Detwiler (born 1986), MLB relief pitcher
Blake DeWitt (born 1985), MLB infielder
John Donaldson (1891–1970), Negro league baseball pitcher
Scott Elbert (born 1985), MLB relief pitcher
A. J. Ellis (born 1981), catcher for Miami Marlins
Hoot Evers (1921–1991), MLB outfielder, 2-time All-Star
David Freese (born 1983), MLB third baseman, 2011 World Series MVP with St. Louis Cardinals
Gabe Gabler (1930–2014), MLB player
Joe Garagiola, Sr. (1926–2016), MLB catcher, broadcaster, television personality
Jeff Gray (born 1981), MLB pitcher
Charlie Grimm (1898–1993), MLB player and manager
Dick Hall (born 1930), MLB pitcher, 2-time World Series winner
Lucas Harrell (born 1985), starting pitcher for Toronto Blue Jays
Tom Henke (born 1957), two-time All-Star pitcher
Bobby Hofman (1925–1994), MLB outfielder
Solly Hofman (1882–1956), MLB outfielder
Al Hollingsworth (1908–1996), MLB pitcher
Ken Holtzman (born 1945), two-time All-Star baseball pitcher
Tommy Hottovy (born 1981), MLB relief pitcher
Elston Howard (1929–1980), Negro league and MLB catcher, 12-time All-Star, six World Series titles
Ryan Howard (born 1979), MLB first baseman, 3-time All-Star
Carl Hubbell (1903–1988), Hall of Fame pitcher, 2-time NL MVP
Eric Hurley (born 1985), MLB pitcher
Ron Hunt (born 1941), MLB infielder, 2-time All-Star
Vern Kennedy (1907–1993), MLB pitcher
Bob Keppel (born 1982), MLB pitcher
Charlie Kerfeld (born 1963), MLB relief pitcher, primarily with Houston Astros
Johnny Kling (1875–1947), MLB catcher, 2-time World Series winner
Darold Knowles (born 1941), MLB pitcher, first to pitch in all seven games of a World Series
Ron Kulpa (born 1968), umpire
Tito Landrum (born 1954), MLB outfielder
Tommy Layne (born 1984), MLB relief pitcher
Sam LeCure (born 1984), MLB pitcher
Dale Long (1926–1991), MLB outfielder
Jerry Lumpe (1933–2014), MLB infielder
Shaun Marcum (born 1981), MLB pitcher
Jay Marshall (born 1983), MLB pitcher
Bake McBride (born 1949), MLB outfielder, 1974 Rookie of Year
Paul Menhart (born 1969), MLB pitcher and pitching coach
Bob Miller (1939–1993), MLB pitcher, 3-time World Series winner
Zach Miner (born 1982), relief pitcher for Seattle Mariners
Logan Morrison (born 1987), outfielder for Tampa Bay Rays
Carl Morton (1944–1983), MLB pitcher, 1970 Rookie of Year
Bill Mueller (born 1971), MLB infielder, 2003 AL batting champ
Don Mueller (1927–2011), MLB infielder, 2-time All-Star
Stan Musial (1920–2013), MLB Hall of Famer, played entire career for St. Louis Cardinals

N–Z

Dave Nicholson (born 1939), MLB outfielder
Al Nipper (born 1959), MLB pitcher and scout
Darren Oliver (born 1970), MLB relief pitcher
Mickey O'Neil (1900–1964), MLB catcher
Mickey Owen (1916–2005), MLB catcher, 4-time All-Star
Josh Outman (born 1984), MLB pitcher
Barney Pelty (1880–1939), MLB pitcher
David Phelps (born 1986), starting pitcher for Miami Marlins
Albert Pujols (born 1980), MLB first baseman with Los Angeles Angels, 10-time All-Star
Pete Reiser (1919–1981), MLB outfielder, 3-time All-Star
Steve Rogers (born 1949), MLB pitcher, 5-time All-Star
Trevor Rosenthal (born 1990), pitcher for St. Louis Cardinals
Bob Scheffing (1913–1985), MLB player and manager
Max Scherzer (born 1984), starting pitcher for Washington Nationals
Art Shamsky (born 1941), MLB outfielder and Israel Baseball League manager
Mike Shannon (born 1939), MLB player and sportscaster for St. Louis Cardinals, 2-time World Series winner
Sonny Siebert (born 1937), MLB pitcher, 2-time All-Star
Dave Silvestri (born 1967), MLB infielder
Shae Simmons (born 1990), MLB pitcher
Roy Smalley Jr. (1926–2011), MLB infielder
Al Smith (1928–2002), MLB outfielder
Paul Splittorff (1946–2011), pitcher for Kansas City Royals, broadcaster
Casey Stengel (c. 1890–1975), Baseball Hall of Fame manager
Mel Stottlemyre (1941–2019), MLB pitcher, 5-time All-Star, pitching coach
Rick Sutcliffe (born 1956), MLB pitcher, 3-time All-Star, TV commentator
Nick Tepesch (born 1988), MLB pitcher
Jacob Turner (born 1991), MLB pitcher
Scott Van Slyke (born 1986), outfielder, Los Angeles Dodgers; son of Andy Van Slyke
Luke Voit (born 1991), MLB first baseman
Earl Weaver (1930–2013), Hall of Fame manager for Baltimore Orioles
Mack Wheat (1893–1979), MLB catcher with Brooklyn Robins and Philadelphia Phillies
Zack Wheat (1888–1972), MLB Hall of Fame left fielder for Brooklyn, Philadelphia Athletics; brother of Mack Wheat
Dick Williams (1929–2011), MLB player and Hall of Fame manager
Lefty Williams (1893–1959), MLB pitcher
Smoky Joe Wood (1889–1995), MLB pitcher, 3-time World Series winner
Glenn Wright (1901–1984), MLB infielder for 1925 World Series champion Pittsburgh Pirates

Basketball

Forrest Clare "Phog" Allen (1885–1974), Hall of Fame college basketball coach
OG Anunoby (born 1997), small forward for Toronto Raptors
Bradley Beal (born 1993), NBA player for the Washington Wizards
Bill Bradley (born 1943), Basketball Hall of Famer, U.S. Senator
Alec Burks (born 1991), shooting guard for Golden State Warriors
Chris Carr (born 1974), shooting guard for six NBA teams
Napheesa Collier (born 1996), WNBA player and Olympic gold medalist
Ben Hansbrough (born 1987), guard for Indiana Pacers
Tyler Hansbrough (born 1985), NBA player and international player, NCAA champion at North Carolina
Josh Harrellson (born 1989), center for New York Knicks
Larry Hughes (born 1979), shooting guard for eight NBA teams
David Lee (born 1983), power forward and center for San Antonio Spurs
Tyronn Lue (born 1977), NBA player, head coach of Cleveland Cavaliers
Patrick McCaw (born 1995), shooting guard for Toronto Raptors
Dan Pippin (1926–1965), Olympic gold medalist in 1952, played at Mizzou
Brandon Rush (born 1985), shooting guard for Golden State Warriors
Kareem Rush (born 1980), shooting guard for L.A. Clippers
Scott Sims (born 1955), guard for San Antonio Spurs
Norm Stewart (born 1935), pro basketball player, longtime Mizzou coach, College Basketball Hall of Fame
Jayson Tatum (born 1998), pro basketball player, former member of the Duke Blue Devils and small forward for the Boston Celtics
David Thirdkill (born 1960), NBA basketball player, 1993 Israeli Basketball Premier League MVP
Anthony Tolliver (born 1985), power forward for Minnesota Timberwolves
 Alex Tyus (born 1988), American-Israeli professional basketball player, also plays for the Israeli national basketball team

Football

Maurice Alexander (born 1991), defensive back for St. Louis Rams
Steve Atwater (born 1966), safety for the Denver Broncos and New York Jets
Allen Barbre (born 1984), offensive guard for Philadelphia Eagles
Tim Barnes (born 1988), center for St. Louis Rams
David Bass (born 1990), defensive end for Chicago Bears
Justin Britt (born 1991), offensive tackle for Seattle Seahawks
Jason Brookins (born 1976), running back, Baltimore Ravens
Colin Brown (born 1985), offensive tackle for Buffalo Bills
Jairus Byrd (born 1986), free safety for New Orleans Saints
Paul Christman (1918–1970), quarterback, College Football Hall of Fame; sportscaster
Adrian Clayborn (born 1988), defensive end for Atlanta Falcons
Chase Coffman (born 1986), tight end for Atlanta Falcons
Jalen Collins (born 1993), cornerback for Atlanta Falcons
Maliek Collins (born 1995), defensive tackle for Dallas Cowboys
Dan Connolly (born 1982), offensive lineman for New England Patriots
Jimmy Conzelman (1898–1970), former NFL halfback and coach, member of Pro Football Hall of Fame
Dan Dierdorf (born 1949), offensive tackle in Pro Football Hall of Fame, sportscaster
Herb Donaldson (born 1985), running back for Dallas Cowboys
Robert Douglas (born 1982), NFL fullback
Kony Ealy (born 1991), defensive end for Carolina Panthers
Ezekiel Elliott (born 1995), NFL running back for Dallas Cowboys
Lenvil Elliott (1951–2008), NFL running back
 Don Faurot (1902–1995), College Football Hall of Fame coach, inventor of Split-T formation
Brian Folkerts (born 1990), center for Carolina Panthers
Josh Freeman (born 1988), NFL quarterback
Blaine Gabbert (born 1989), quarterback for Arizona Cardinals
Justin Gage (born 1981), wide receiver for Tennessee Titans
E. J. Gaines (born 1992), cornerback for St. Louis Rams
Tony Galbreath (born 1954), NFL running back
Markus Golden (born 1991), NFL outside linebacker
Conrad Goode (born 1962), NFL offensive lineman
Mark Herzlich (born 1987), linebacker for New York Giants
Cal Hubbard (1900–1977), only person in both Baseball Hall of Fame and Pro Football Hall of Fame
Brandon Joyce (1984–2010), offensive lineman, CFL and NFL
Terry Joyce (1954–2011), college All-American, NFL punter
Howard Kindig (born 1941), defensive end, 10-year NFL career
Ryan Lilja (born 1981), guard for Kansas City Chiefs
Brandon Lloyd (born 1981), wide receiver for San Francisco 49ers
Jeremy Maclin (born 1988), wide receiver for Kansas City Chiefs
Marvin McNutt (born 1989), wide receiver for Philadelphia Eagles
Eric Moore (born 1965), NFL guard
William Moore (born 1985), safety for Atlanta Falcons
C. J. Mosley (born 1983), defensive tackle for Miami Dolphins
Eddie Moss, special teams for St. Louis Cardinals
Jim Musick (1910–1992), running back, Boston Redskins
Neil Rackers (born 1976), placekicker for Houston Texans
Shane Ray (born 1993), outside linebacker for Denver Broncos
Sheldon Richardson (born 1990), defensive end for New York Jets
Gijon Robinson (born 1984), tight end for Indianapolis Colts
Martin Rucker (born 1985), tight end for Dallas Cowboys
Mike Rucker (born 1975), defensive end for Carolina Panthers
Aldon Smith (born 1989), linebacker for Oakland Raiders
Justin Smith (born 1979), defensive end for San Francisco 49ers
Bill Snyder (born 1939), Current Kansas State University head coach and College Football Hall of Fame
Donald Stephenson (born 1988), offensive tackle for Kansas City Chiefs
Roger Wehrli (born 1947), Hall of Fame cornerback with St. Louis Cardinals
James Wilder Sr. (born 1958), 10-year NFL running back
Brandon Williams (born 1989), nose tackle for Baltimore Ravens
Gregg Williams (born 1958), NFL coach, defensive coordinator
Sylvester Williams (born 1988), nose tackle for Denver Broncos
Kellen Winslow (born 1957), Hall of Fame tight end with San Diego Chargers

Golf

Amy Alcott (born 1956), professional golfer, World Golf Hall of Fame
Brandel Chamblee (born 1962), PGA Tour golfer
Jay Haas (born 1953), PGA Tour golfer
Hale Irwin (born 1945), golfer; oldest person (45) to win US Open (1990)
Jeff Maggert (born 1964), PGA Tour golfer
Tom Pernice Jr. (born 1959), PGA Tour golfer
Judy Rankin (born 1945), professional golfer, World Golf Hall of Fame
Johnny Revolta (1911–1991), winner of 1935 PGA Championship
Cathy Reynolds (born 1957), LPGA Tour golfer
Horton Smith (1908–1963), winner of first Masters, World Golf Hall of Fame
Payne Stewart (1957–1999), golfer, 2-time US Open champion
Tom Watson (born 1949), 8-time major champion, 1990 Ryder Cup captain, World Golf Hall of Fame
Larry Ziegler (born 1939), PGA Tour golfer

Ice hockey

Ben Bishop (born 1986), NHL Dallas Stars
Chris Wideman (born 1990), NHL Ottawa Senators
Michael Davies (born 1986), AHL Chicago Wolves
Cam Janssen (born 1984), EIHL Nottingham Panthers
Luke Kunin (born 1997), NHL hockey player
Pat LaFontaine (born 1965), NHL Buffalo Sabres, New York Islanders, New York Rangers
Patrick Maroon (born 1988), NHL Tampa Bay Lightning
Mike McKenna (born 1983), AHL Portland Pirates
Paul Stastny (born 1985), NHL St. Louis Blues
Travis Turnbull (born 1986), DEL Düsseldorfer EG
Joe Vitale (born 1985), NHL Arizona Coyotes
Landon Wilson (born 1975), AHL Texas Stars

Professional wrestling

 Freddie Blassie (1918–2003), wrestler and manager
"Bulldog" Bob Brown (1938–1997), wrestler and booker
Bob Geigel (1924–2014), retired wrestler, promoter, and former NWA President
Glenn Jacobs (born 1967), ring name "Kane"; also an actor
Rufus R. Jones (1933–1993), NWA wrestler and businessman
Matthew Korklan (born 1983), ring names "Matt Sydal" and "Evan Bourne"
Sam Muchnick (1905–1998), founder of St. Louis Wrestling Club and co-founder of the National Wrestling Alliance (NWA)
Trevor Murdoch (born 1978), WWE tag team champion
Matt Murphy (born 1979), wrestler and author
Barry Orton, wrestler
"Cowboy" Bob Orton (born 1950), wrestler and member of WWE Hall of Fame; father of Randy Orton
Randy Orton (born 1980), third-generation pro wrestler
Harley Race (1943–2019), 8-time NWA World Heavyweight Champion; member of the WWE Hall of Fameand Professional Wrestling Hall of Fame
Butch Reed (1954–2021), NWA and WCW Tag Team Champion
Lou Thesz (1916–2002), superstar of professional wrestling's "Golden Age"

Miscellaneous sports

 Virgil Akins (1928–2011), welterweight boxing champion
 Devon Alexander (born 1987), boxer, WBC and IBF Light Welterweight champion
 Henry Armstrong (1912–1988), boxer (born in Mississippi but grew up in St. Louis)
 Butch Buchholz (born 1940), Hall of Fame tennis player
 Christian Cantwell (born 1980), Olympian, world champion shot putter
John Coughlin (1985–2019), figure skater, committed suicide
 J'den Cox (born 1995), Olympic freestyle wrestler
 Michael Chandler (born 1986), UFC fighter
 Kim Chizevsky-Nicholls (born 1968), IFBB pro bodybuilder
 Dwight F. Davis (1879–1945), tennis player, founder of the Davis Cup
 Daryl Doran (born 1963), professional soccer player
 Lori Endicott (born 1967), volleyball player and Olympian
 Doris Hart (1925–2015), Hall of Fame tennis player, winner of six Grand Slam singles titles
 Sammie Henson (born 1971), Olympic silver medalist and world champion in freestyle wrestling
 Bud Houser (1901–1994), three-time Olympic gold medalist in shot put and discus
 Jack Jewsbury (born 1981), Major League Soccer player (Portland Timbers)
 Ben A. Jones (1882–1961), thoroughbred horse trainer
 Horace A. "Jimmy" Jones (1906–2001), thoroughbred horse trainer
 Lesa Lewis (born 1967), IFBB professional bodybuilder
 Conn McCreary (1921–1979), Hall of Fame jockey, winner of 1944 and 1951 Kentucky Derby
 Chuck McKinley (1941–1986), Hall of Fame tennis player, 1963 Wimbledon champion
 Josh Prenot (born 1995), swimmer, Olympic silver medalist (200m breaststroke), NCAA champion (400m individual medley), and American record holder (200m breaststroke)
 DeAnna Price (born 1993), record holder in hammer throw, competed at two Olympic Summer Games
 Becky Sauerbrunn (born 1985), National Women's Soccer League and USWNT player (FC Kansas City); Defender of the Year 2013, 2014; 2015 FIFA Women's World Cup winner
 Helen Stephens (1918–1994), two-time gold medalist in track and field at 1936 Summer Olympics
 Scott Touzinsky (born 1982), volleyball player and coach
 Jacarra Winchester (born 1992), Olympic freestyle wrestler, world champion in 2019
 Alex White (born 1988), mixed martial artist

Aviation and aerospace

 Thomas Akers (born 1953), scientist and NASA astronaut on four Space Shuttle missions
 Bill Lear (1902–1978), founder of Lear Jet
 Charles Lindbergh (1902–1974), aviator, first solo non-stop trans-Atlantic flight in 1927 (born in Detroit, Michigan but lived in St. Louis)
 James Smith McDonnell (1899–1980), founder of McDonnell Aircraft Corporation (later McDonnell Douglas)

Business

 William Henry Ashley (1778–1838), founder of Rocky Mountain Fur Company, politician
 Charles S. L. Baker (1859–1926), African-American businessman and inventor
 Henry W. Bloch (1922–2019), co-founder of H&R Block tax services
 Richard Bloch (1926–2004), co-founder of H&R Block tax services
 Adolphus Busch (1839–1913), founder of Anheuser-Busch (the world's largest brewer)
 August "Gussie" Busch (1899–1989), owned Anheuser-Busch (the world's largest brewer), and St. Louis Cardinals baseball team
 Jim Crane, businessman, owner of the Houston Astros
 William H. Danforth (1870–1955), founder of Ralston Purina Company
 John Doerr (born 1951), venture capitalist at Kleiner Perkins Caufield & Byers
 James Buchanan Eads (1820–1887), civil engineer and inventor
 Charles Eames (1907–1978), designer and architect
 David Glass (1935–2020), former president and CEO of Wal-Mart, owner of Kansas City Royals baseball team
 Joyce Hall (1891–1982), founder of Hallmark Cards
 William Preston Hall (1864–1932), circus empresario and animal broker
 Howard R. Hughes, Sr. (1869–1924), oil drill bit and tool inventor; father of Howard Hughes, reclusive billionaire
 George M. Keller (1923–2008), chairman of Standard Oil Company of California in the 1980s
 R. Crosby Kemper Jr. (1927–2014), chairman emeritus UMB Financial Corporation, philanthropist
 William Thornton Kemper, Sr. (1866–1938), patriarch of Kemper family railroad and banking empire which included Commerce Bancshares and United Missouri Bank
 Ewing Kauffman (1916–1993), pharmaceutical magnate, philanthropist and founder of the Kansas City Royals baseball team
 Stan Kroenke (born 1947), owner of Kroenke Sports Enterprises
 Rebecca Mark-Jusbasche (born 1954), former head of Enron International
 N. O. Nelson (1844–1922), founder of the N. O. Nelson Manufacturing Company
 Thomas F. O'Neil, chairman of RKO General Studios, brought movies to television
 J. C. Penney (1875–1971), businessman and entrepreneur
 Rex Sinquefield (born 1944), financial executive who created Standard & Poor's first index fund, supporter of conservative political causes
 John Sperling (1921–2014), businessman and founder of the University of Phoenix
 Gerard Swope (1872–1957), president of General Electric
 Jack C. Taylor (1922–2016), founder of Enterprise Rent-A-Car, billionaire philanthropist
 Sam Walton (1918–1992), founder of Wal-Mart
 Robert E. Wood (1879–1969), vice-president of Sears Roebuck

Criminals and outlaws

Anthony Brancato (1913–1951), freelance Mafia gunman, half of "The Two Tonys" portrayed in the movie L.A. Confidential
 Ray and Faye Copeland (1914–1993, 1921–2003), serial killers, oldest couple ever sentenced to death in the United States
Egan's Rats, early crime family in St. Louis
Leo Vincent Brothers (1899–1950), low-level member; later moved to Chicago and became part of Al Capone's organization
Fred Burke (1893–1940), gunman for Egan's Rats; suspected of participating in the St. Valentine's Day Massacre
William "Dint" Colbeck (1890–1943), assumed leadership of Egan's Rats after the assassination of Willie Egan
Walter Costello (1889–1917), bodyguard to Willie Egan, killer of Harry Dunn
Harry "Cherries" Dunn (1892–1916)
Thomas Egan (1874–1919), organizer of Egan's Rats
Willie Egan (1884–1921), brother and right-hand man of gang founder Tom Egan; led the gang after Tom's death
Max Greenberg (1883–1933), one of the few Jewish members of the mostly Irish Egan gang; associate/friend of Meyer Lansky
Frank Hackethal (1891–1954), robber and resort owner/money launderer for Egan's Rats
Thomas "Snake" Kinney (1868–1912), Missouri State Senator and co-founder of Egan's Rats
David "Chippy" Robinson (1897–1967), bank robber and enforcer for Egan's Rats
William "Skippy" Rohan (1871–1916)
 Roy Gardner (1884–1940), arms smuggler and notorious 1920s bank robber
 Tom Horn (1860–1903), Old West lawman, army scout, outlaw and assassin
 Kansas City crime family
Charles Binaggio (1909–1950), killed along with Charles Gargotta at the First Ward Democratic Club in downtown Kansas City
Anthony Brancato (1913–1951)
William "Willie Rat" Cammisano (1914–1995), enforcer for the K.C. mob
Charles Carrollo (1902–1979), led the Kansas City mob after Johnny Lazia's assassination
Anthony Civella (1930–2006), led the K.C. crime family in the 1980s and 1990s; son of Carl Civella and nephew of Nicholas Civella
Carl "Cork" Civella (1910–1994), brother of Nicholas Civella and a top lieutenant in the crime family; father of Anthony Civella
Nicholas Civella (1912–1983), led the Kansas City crime family from the 1950s through the 1970s
Carl "Tuffy" DeLuna (1927–2008), underboss of the Kansas City crime family; brother-in-law of Anthony Civella
Charles "Pretty Boy" Floyd (1904–1934), took part in the Union Station Massacre
Charles "Mad Dog" Gargotta (1900–1950), top enforcer of the KC crime family
Anthony Gizzo (1902–1953), led Kansas City crime family in the early 1950s
John Lazia (1896–1934), leader of the Kansas City crime family in the 1920s and early 1930s
 Kenneth Lay (1942–2006), chairman and CEO of Enron, convicted of securities fraud
 Little Britches (1879 – year of death unknown), female bandit associated with Cattle Annie and the Doolin gang
 James Earl Ray (1928–1998), assassin of civil rights leader Martin Luther King Jr.; escapee from the Missouri State Penitentiary
James-Younger Gang:
Frank James (1843–1915), outlaw
Jesse James (1847–1882), outlaw
Cole Younger (1844–1916), outlaw
John Younger (1851–1874), outlaw
Bob Younger (1853–1899), outlaw
Jim Younger (1848–1902), outlaw
Bob Ford (1862–1892), outlaw who gunned down Jesse James
Tom Pendergast (1873–1945), long-time political boss of Kansas City and western Missouri; responsible for the political rise of Harry S. Truman; imprisoned for tax evasion
Belle Starr (1848–1889), female outlaw of the Old West
St. Louis crime family
Anthony Giordano (1914–1980), leader of the St. Louis crime family in the 1960s and 1970s
Matthew Trupiano (1938–1997), nephew of Anthony Giordano, crime family boss in the 1980s
John Vitale (1909–1982), crime family boss in the early 1980s

Entertainment

Film, television and theater

A–C

 Goodman Ace (1899–1982), television writer, radio host and comedian
 Jane Ace (1897–1974), radio actress and host
 Zoë Akins (1886–1958), Pulitzer Prize-winning playwright, poet
 Robert Altman (1925–2006), film director, M*A*S*H, Nashville, Gosford Park
 Ed Asner (1929–2021), Emmy Award-winning actor, The Mary Tyler Moore Show, Lou Grant; Up, Elf
 Scott Bakula (born 1954), actor, Quantum Leap, Star Trek: Enterprise, NCIS: New Orleans
 Josephine Baker (1906–1975), dancer, singer, actress
 Tisha Terrasini Banker (born 1973), actress
 Ryan Michelle Bathe (born 1976), actress, Boston Legal, Army Wives, Retired at 35
 Anne Bauchens (1882–1967), Oscar-winning film editor
 John Beal (1909–1997), actor, Les Misérables, Alimony
 Gerry Becker (born 1951), actor
 Noah Beery (1882–1946), actor, The Mark of Zorro
 Wallace Beery (1885–1949), Oscar-winning actor, The Champ, Min and Bill, Viva Villa!
 Rob Benedict (born 1970), actor, Felicity, Head Case, Threshold
 Bob Bergen (born 1964), voice actor
 Fred Berry (1951–2003), actor, What's Happening!!
 Linda Blair (born 1959), actress, The Exorcist, Airport 1975
 Linda Bloodworth-Thomason, screenwriter, Designing Women, Evening Shade
 Matt Bomer (born 1977), actor, White Collar
 Johnny Yong Bosch (born 1976), singer, Eyeshine; actor, Trigun, Power Rangers
 Jeff Branson (born 1977), actor
 Diane Brewster (1931–1991), actress
 Brent Briscoe (born 1961), actor, Yes Man, National Treasure: Book of Secrets, Spider-Man 2
 Kent Broadhurst (born 1940), actor
 Edgar Buchanan (1903–1979), actor, Petticoat Junction
 Norbert Leo Butz (born 1967), Tony Award-winning stage actor
 Christy Cabanne (1888–1950), director, Jane Eyre
 Jessica Capshaw (born 1976), actress, The Practice
 Morris Carnovsky (1897–1992), actor, Edge of Darkness, Dead Reckoning
 Don Cheadle (born 1964), actor, Hotel Rwanda, Traffic, Boogie Nights, Ocean's Eleven, The Rat Pack
 Marguerite Churchill (1910–2000), actress, The Big Trail, The Walking Dead
 Anthony Cistaro (born 1963), actor, Charmed, Witchblade
 Sarah Clarke (born 1972), actress, Nina Myers on 24
 Andy Cohen (born 1968), author, producer, and television personality, Watch What Happens Live
 Lynn Cohen (1933–2020), actress, Law & Order, Sex and the City
 Frank Converse (born 1938), actor, Movin' On, N.Y.P.D.
 Bert Convy (1933–1991), actor and TV personality, Semi-Tough
 Chris Cooper (born 1951), Oscar-winning actor, Lonesome Dove, The Bourne Identity, American Beauty, Breach

 Joan Crawford (1905–1977), Oscar-winning actress, Mildred Pierce, The Women, What Ever Happened to Baby Jane?
 Greg Cromer (born 1971), actor
 Robert Cummings (1908–1990), actor, Kings Row, Saboteur, Love That Bob, Dial M for Murder

D–G

 Erin Daniels (born 1973), actress, The L Word
 Nathan Darrow (born 1976), actor, House of Cards
 Don S. Davis (1942–2008), actor, Stargate SG-1, Twin Peaks
 Kurt Deutsch, actor, Models Inc.
 Walt Disney (1901–1966), iconic film and television producer, studio mogul, director, screenwriter, voice actor and animator
Mary Alice Dwyer-Dobbin, television producer
 Dale Dye (born 1944), actor, Saving Private Ryan, Mission: Impossible, Band of Brothers
 Cliff Edwards (1895–1971), actor, musician; the voice of Jiminy Cricket
 Frank Faylen (1905–1985), actor, It's a Wonderful Life, Detective Story, Dobie Gillis
 Hala Finley (born 2009), actress
 Jenna Fischer (born 1974), actress, The Office, Hall Pass, Blades of Glory (born in Fort Wayne, Indiana, grew up in St. Louis)
 Henderson Forsythe (1917–2006), actor, As the World Turns
 James Franciscus (1934–1991), actor, Mr. Novak, Naked City, Marooned, Beneath the Planet of the Apes
 Phyllis Fraser (1915–2006), actress, journalist, children's book publisher, wife of Bennett Cerf and Robert F. Wagner Jr.
 Friz Freleng (1905–1995), film producer, director, screenwriter, and animator, Looney Tunes, Merrie Melodies
 Bob Gale (born 1951), screenwriter, the Back to the Future trilogy
 Betty Garrett (1919–2011), actress, On the Town, Take Me Out to the Ball Game, Laverne & Shirley
 Heather Goldenhersh (born 1973), actress, The Class, School of Rock
 John Goodman (born 1952), actor, Monsters, Inc., Roseanne, The Babe, Barton Fink, O Brother, Where Art Thou?, The Big Lebowski
 Lucas Grabeel (born 1984), actor, High School Musical, Milk
 Betty Grable (1916–1973), actress, singer and World War II pin-up girl, Moon Over Miami, How to Marry a Millionaire
Bryan Greenberg (born 1978), actor, musician, One Tree Hill, October Road, How to Make It in America
 Dabbs Greer (1917–2007), actor, Little House on the Prairie, Gunsmoke, The Green Mile
 Eddie Griffin (born 1968), actor, comedian, Undercover Brother, Norbit
 Davis Guggenheim (born 1963), director, producer
 Robert Guillaume (1927–2017), actor, Benson, Soap, The Lion King, Sports Night
 James Gunn (born 1970), film director and screenwriter
 Moses Gunn (1929–1993), actor, Father Murphy, The Cowboys, Shaft, Ragtime, Heartbreak Ridge
 Sean Gunn (born 1974), actor, Gilmore Girls, October Road

H–M

 Jon Hamm (born 1971), actor, Mad Men, The Town, Unbreakable Kimmy Schmidt, Baby Driver
 Tess Harper (born 1950), actress, Breaking Bad, No Country for Old Men, Crimes of the Heart
 Jean Harlow (1911–1937), actress and sex symbol
 George Hearn (born 1934), actor, primarily Broadway and musical theatre
 George Hickenlooper (1965–2010), documentary filmmaker, Hearts of Darkness, Dogtown
 Dennis Hopper (1936–2010), actor, filmmaker, artist, Easy Rider, Apocalypse Now, Speed, Hoosiers
 Arliss Howard (born 1954), actor, writer and director, Full Metal Jacket, Wilder Napalm, Moneyball
 Rupert Hughes (1872–1956), film director, composer; uncle of reclusive billionaire Howard Hughes
 John Huston (1906–1987), actor and Oscar-winning film director, The Maltese Falcon, Key Largo, The African Queen
 Don Johnson (born 1949), actor, Miami Vice, Nash Bridges, Guilty as Sin, Tin Cup, Django Unchained
 Jay Johnson (born 1977), actor, The Young and the Restless, Scrubs
 Janet Jones (born 1961), actress, dancer, wife of hockey's Wayne Gretzky
 Neal Jones (born 1960), actor, Dirty Dancing, G.I. Jane
 Brenda Joyce (1917–2009), actress, Little Tokyo, U.S.A., Tarzan movies in the 1940s
 Andreas Katsulas (1946–2006), actor, Babylon 5, Star Trek: The Next Generation
 Ellie Kemper (born 1980), actress, The Office, Unbreakable Kimmy Schmidt
 Edward Kerr (born 1966), actor, seaQuest DSV, What I Like About You
 Lincoln Kilpatrick (1932–2004), actor
 Kevin Kline (born 1947), Oscar-winning actor, Sophie's Choice, The Big Chill, A Fish Called Wanda, Last Vegas
 Evalyn Knapp (1906–1981), actress, Perils of Pauline, In Old Santa Fe
 David Koechner (born 1962), actor and comedian, Saturday Night Live, Anchorman
 Laura La Plante (1904–1996), actress in silent films
 Kasi Lemmons (born 1961), actress and director, Eve's Bayou, Talk to Me
 Angela Lindvall (born 1979), actress
 Mark Linn-Baker (born 1954), actor, My Favorite Year, Larry Appleton on Perfect Strangers
 Robert Lowery (1913–1971), actor, Batman in 1940s serial
 Marsha Mason (born 1942), actress, Sibs, The Goodbye Girl, Only When I Laugh, Chapter Two, Frasier
 Michael Massee (1952–2016), actor, 24, Seven, The Crow
 Wendell Mayes (1919–1992), screenwriter, The Spirit of St. Louis, North to Alaska, Von Ryan's Express
 Virginia Mayo (1920–2005), actress, The Best Years of Our Lives, White Heat, The Secret Life of Walter Mitty
 Edie McClurg (born 1951), actress, Ferris Bueller's Day Off, 7th Heaven
 Frank McGrath (1903–1967), actor, Wagon Train
 Steve McQueen (1930–1980), actor, The Sand Pebbles, The Great Escape, The Towering Inferno, Bullitt
 John Milius (born 1944), screenwriter, director, producer, Red Dawn, The Hunt for Red October, Conan the Barbarian
 Wendy Moniz (born 1969), actress, The Guardian, Guiding Light, Nash Bridges, Betrayal
 Mircea Monroe, actress, model, Cellular, Episodes

N–Z

 Dustin Nguyen (born 1962), actor, 21 Jump Street, V.I.P.
 Kathleen Nolan (born 1933), actress, The Real McCoys
 Eva Novak (1898–1988), actress of the silent film era, The King of the Kitchen
 Jane Novak (1896–1990), actress of the silent film era, Treat'Em Rough, Redskin
 Dan O'Bannon (1946–2009), film director and screenwriter, Heavy Metal, Dark Star, Total Recall
 Denis O'Hare (born 1962), actor, Brothers & Sisters, Sweet Charity, True Blood
 Kevin O'Morrison (1916–2016), actor and playwright
 Timothy Omundson (born 1969), actor, Psych, Judging Amy
 Diana Ossana, screenwriter, Brokeback Mountain, Pretty Boy Floyd
 Geraldine Page (1924–1987), Oscar-winning actress, Summer and Smoke, Sweet Bird of Youth, The Trip to Bountiful
 Carlos PenaVega (born 1989), actor, singer, and dancer, Big Time Rush
 Evan Peters (born 1987), actor, American Horror Story, Invasion, Kick-Ass
 Julie Piekarski (born 1963), actress, The Facts of Life
 Brad Pitt (born 1963), actor and producer, Thelma & Louise, 12 Monkeys, Seven, Moneyball, World War Z
 William Powell (1892–1984), actor, The Thin Man, Life with Father, My Man Godfrey, Mister Roberts
 Vincent Price (1911–1993), actor, Laura, House of Wax, The Fly, The Ten Commandments, Edward Scissorhands
 Sally Rand (1904–1979), burlesque dancer, actress
 Doris Roberts (1925–2016), actress, Everybody Loves Raymond
 Leonard Roberts (born 1972), actor, Heroes, Buffy the Vampire Slayer
 Ginger Rogers (1911–1995), Oscar-winning actress, dance partner of Fred Astaire
 Paul Rudd (born 1969), actor, comedian, writer, and producer, I Love You, Man, Ant-Man
 Sol Smith Russell (1848–1902), 19th-century stage actor
 Jacqueline Scott (1931–2020), actress, Charley Varrick
 Martha Scott (1912–2003), actress, The Ten Commandments, Ben-Hur
 Sara Shane (1928–2022), actress, Magnificent Obsession, The King and Four Queens, Tarzan's Greatest Adventure
 Phyllis Smith (born 1951), actress, The Office
 Kelly Stables (born 1978), actress, The Exes, W.I.T.C.H., Two and a Half Men
 Craig Stevens (1918–2000), actor, State Trooper, Peter Gunn
 Christian Stolte (born 1962), actor, Prison Break
 Skyler Stone (born 1979), actor, Raising Hope, The Island
 Eric Stonestreet (born 1971), actor, Modern Family
 Betty Thomas (born 1948), actress and director, Hill Street Blues, The Brady Bunch Movie, Dr. Dolittle, Private Parts
 Kay Thompson (1909–1998), actress, Funny Face
 Sidney Toler (1874–1947), actor, Charlie Chan films
 William Traylor (1930–1989), actor, Fletch; founder of The Loft Studio/acting school
 Kathleen Turner (born 1954), actress, Body Heat, Romancing the Stone, Prizzi's Honor, Serial Mom
 Stephen Barker Turner (born 1968), actor
 Dick Van Dyke (born 1925), actor, The Dick Van Dyke Show, Mary Poppins, Diagnosis: Murder
 Jerry Van Dyke (1931–2018), actor, Coach, McLintock!, The Courtship of Eddie's Father
 Jack Wagner (born 1959), actor/singer Melrose Place, General Hospital
 Virgil Ward (1911–2004), professional fisherman and host of Championship Fishing
 Ruth Warrick (1916–2005), actress, Citizen Kane, All My Children
 Dennis Weaver (1924–2006), actor, Gunsmoke, McCloud
 William White (1921–1985), actor, producer and director
 Mary Wickes (1910–1995), actress, White Christmas, Sister Act
 Dianne Wiest (born 1948), 2-time Oscar-winning actress
 Jason Wiles (born 1970), actor, Third Watch, Persons Unknown
 Mykelti Williamson (born 1960), actor, Forrest Gump, Fences
 Lanford Wilson (April 13, 1937 – March 24, 2011), playwright, director, Lemon Sky, Redwood Curtain, Hallmark Hall of Fame
 Shelley Winters (1920–2006), 2-time Oscar-winning actress
 Jane Wyman (1917–2007), Oscar-winning actress; former wife of Ronald Reagan

Comedians

 Cedric The Entertainer (born 1964), actor, comedian
 Jo Firestone, actress, comedian, writer
 Redd Foxx (1922–1991), comedian, starred in Sanford and Son
 Dick Gregory (1932–2017), comedian, social activist
 Craig Kilborn (born 1962), comedian, actor, former talk show host
 Kathleen Madigan (born 1965), comedian
 Kevin Nealon (born 1953), actor, comedian
 Randy and Jason Sklar (born 1972), identi*cal twin comedians, hosts of ESPN Classic's Cheap Seats
 Guy Torry (born 1969), actor, comedian
 Joe Torry (born 1965), actor, comedian

Cartoonists

 Ralph Barton (1891–1931), cartoonist
 George Booth (1926–2022), cartoonist for The New Yorker
 Lee Falk (1911–1999), cartoonist, The Phantom, Mandrake the Magician
 Al Hirschfeld (1903–2003), caricaturist and cartoonist known for drawing celebrities
 Fred Lasswell (1916–2001), cartoonist, Barney Google and Snuffy Smith
 Glenn McCoy (born 1965), cartoonist, The Duplex, The Flying McCoys
 George McManus (1884–1954), cartoonist, Maggie and Jiggs
 Mike Peters (born 1943), cartoonist, Mother Goose & Grimm
 Dan Piraro (born 1958), cartoonist, Bizarro
 Mort Walker (1923–2018), cartoonist, Beetle Bailey

Magicians and mentalists

 Morgan Strebler (born 1976), magician and mentalist; Las Vegas award-winning performer

Music

Bluegrass and country

 Lennie Aleshire (1890–1987), country-bluegrass pioneer and vaudeville act
 Connie Cato (born 1955), country music singer
 Shirley Collie Nelson (1931–2010), American country music and rockabilly singer, yodeler, guitarist and songwriter
 Helen Cornelius (born 1941), country singer best known for duets with Jim Ed Brown
 Rusty Draper (1923–2003), country and rockabilly singer/guitarist
 The Duke of Paducah (1901–1986), Grand Ole Opry comedian and member of the Country Music Hall of Fame
 Sara Evans (born 1971), country music star
 Tyler Farr, country music singer 
 Narvel Felts, (born 1938), country music singer 
 Bob Ferguson (1927–2001), country music songwriter and producer
 Teea Goans, American country music singer
 John Hartford (1937–2001), country and bluegrass music composer and performer
 Jan Howard (1929–2020), country music singer and member of the Grand Ole Opry
 Ferlin Husky (1925–2011), singer and member of the Country Music Hall of Fame, former member of the Grand Ole Opry
 Brett James, country music singer-songwriter and record producer
 Chris Janson, (born 1986), American country music singer-songwriter
 The Kendalls, Grammy-winning country duo from the 1970s and 1980s
 Speck Rhodes, (1915–2000), country music comedian and entertainer
 Tom Shapiro, country music songwriter and record producer
 Jack Shook (1910–1986), American guitarist and a Grand Ole Opry star
 Tim Spencer, (1908–1974), American singer-songwriter, actor, member of the Original Sons of the Pioneers, member of the Country Music Hall of Fame
 Tate Stevens, country music singer and 2012 winner of The X Factor
 Wynn Stewart (1934–1985), country music singer, progenitor of the Bakersfield sound
 Billy Swan (born 1942), American country singer-songwriter
 Trent Tomlinson (born 1975), country singer-songwriter
 Leroy Van Dyke (born 1929), country singer best known for "The Auctioneer" and "Walk on By", former member of the Grand Ole Opry
 Darrin Vincent (born 1970), half of the Grammy-nominated bluegrass group Dailey & Vincent; record producer
 Rhonda Vincent (born 1962), bluegrass singer and musician, seven-time IMBA Female Vocalist of the Year
 Porter Wagoner (1927–2007), country music singer-songwriter and Grand Ole Opry member. Member of the Country Music Hall of Fame
 Jerry Wallace (1928–2008), American country and pop singer
 Dallas Wayne, Austin, Texas-based singer-songwriter, voice-over artist and on-air radio personality for Sirius Satellite Radio
 Speedy West, (1923–2003), American pedal steel guitarist and record producer
 Onie Wheeler (1921–1984), country and bluegrass musician 
 Leona Williams (born 1943), American country music singer
 Chely Wright (born 1970), American country music singer and activist
 Billy Yates (born 1963), American country music artist and songwriter 
 Reggie Young (1936–2019), American session musician

Jazz

 Oleta Adams (born 1953), soul, jazz and gospel singer
 Ahmad Alaadeen (1934–2010), jazz saxophonist and composer
 Norman Brown (born 1970), smooth jazz musician
 Jimmy Forrest (1920–1980), jazz tenor saxophonist
 Grant Green (1935–1979), jazz guitarist
 Coleman Hawkins (1904–1969), jazz tenor saxophonist
 Bob James (born 1939), smooth jazz musician
 Scott Joplin (1867–1917), ragtime musician and composer
 Pat Metheny (born 1954), jazz guitarist and musician
 Lennie Niehaus (1929–2020), alto saxophonist, arranger, and composer
 Charlie "Bird" Parker (1920–1955), jazz saxophonist and composer
 David Sanborn (born 1945), smooth jazz musician
 Wilbur Sweatman (1882–1961), Dixieland jazz and ragtime composer and bandleader
 Bob Brookmeyer (1929-2011), valve trombonist and composer
 Clark Terry (1920–2015), swing and bebop trumpet and flugelhorn player

Rhythm & blues, pop, rap and hip-hop

 Akon (born 1977), rhythm and blues musician, music producer
 Fontella Bass (1940–2012), singer best known for 1965 hit Rescue Me
 Chingy (born 1980), rapper, actor
 Eminem (born 1972), rap musician (grew up partly in St. Joseph)
 Nelly (born 1974), rap musician (born in Texas and raised in St. Louis)
 David Peaston (1957–2012), R&B and Gospel singer
 St. Lunatics, hip hop, best known for collaborations with Nelly
 Tech N9ne (born 1971), rapper
 Kimberly Wyatt, singer and dancer, Pussycat Dolls

 SZA (born 1989), American singer-songwriter, born in St. Louis

Rock & roll

 Chuck Berry (1926–2017), guitarist, musician, singer, songwriter, pioneer of rock & roll, in Rock & Roll Hall of Fame
 The Bottle Rockets (formed 1992), rock, alt-country, roots rock
 T Bone Burnett (born 1948), musician, songwriter, and soundtrack and record producer
 Cavo, hard rock band (formed in St. Louis)
 David Cook (born 1982), 2008 American Idol winner from Blue Springs
 Sheryl Crow (born 1962), Grammy-winning singer-songwriter
 Gravity Kills, industrial rock band, formed in Jefferson City
 Johnnie Johnson (1924–2005), early rock & roll and blues piano player; member of Rock & Roll Hall of Fame
 King's X, hard rock, progressive metal band, formed in Springfield
 Michael McDonald (born 1952), singer, former Doobie Brothers frontman
 Missouri, band known for classic rock song "Movin' On", formed in Kansas City
 Ozark Mountain Daredevils, rock band known for the hits "Jackie Blue" and "If You Wanna Get To Heaven", formed in Springfield
 Louise Post, founder, lead singer and guitarist of alternative rock band Veruca Salt
 Puddle of Mudd, rock band, formed in Kansas City
 The Rainmakers, rock band, formed in Kansas City
 Jay Reatard (1980–2010), garage punk musician, born in Lilbourn
 Wes Scantlin (born 1972), lead singer and guitarist of post-grunge band Puddle of Mudd
 Shooting Star, 1970s and 1980s rock band, from Kansas City
 Story of the Year, emo rock band, formed in St. Louis
 The Urge, rock band, formed in St. Louis
 Bob Walkenhorst, founder and lead singer of alternative rock band The Rainmakers
 Story of the Year, rock band, formed in St. Louis
 Steve Walsh (born 1951), lead vocalist, songwriter and keyboardist for the progressive rock group Kansas and Streets

Other music

 Doris Akers (1923–1995), gospel music singer and composer
 Martha Bass (1921–1998), gospel singer with Clara Ward Singers and solo career
 Burt Bacharach (born 1928), pianist, composer
 Neal E. Boyd (1975–2018), opera vocalist, winner of 2008 America's Got Talent competition
 Grace Bumbry (born 1937), opera soprano
 Sarah Caldwell (1924–2006), opera conductor
 Sara Groves (born 1972), Contemporary Christian singer, record producer, author
 Dan Landrum (born 1961), hammer dulcimer player, featured instrumentalist with Yanni
 Basil Poledouris (1945–2006), film soundtrack composer
 H. Owen Reed (1910–2014), composer and conductor
 Willie Mae Ford Smith (1904–1994), Gospel singer
 Virgil Thomson (1896–1989), composer and critic
 Helen Traubel (1899–1972), opera vocalist
 Grace VanderWaal (born 2004), singer-songwriter, ukuleleist, winner of America's Got Talent season 11

Radio and television

 Bob Barker (born 1923), television game show host
 Jim Bohannon (born 1944), radio talk show host
 Rush Limbaugh (1951–2021), radio talk show host
 Dana Loesch (born 1978), radio talk show host and television host at TheBlaze
 Melanie Morgan (born 1956), radio personality with KSFO in San Francisco
 Erich "Mancow" Muller (born 1966), radio and TV personality, Mancow's Morning Madhouse
 Marlin Perkins (1905–1986), zoologist and host of Mutual of Omaha's Wild Kingdom
 April Scott (born 1979), model, Deal or No Deal and SOAPnet's Soap Talk
 Scott Shannon (born 1947), disc jockey for many radio stations across the country, hosted radio show America's Greatest Hits
 Chris Stigall (born 1977), talk radio personality for Philadelphia's WPHT

Beauty pageant titleholders

 Debbye Turner (born 1965), Miss America 1990
 Shandi Finnessey (born 1978), Miss USA 2004

Journalism

 Jabari Asim (born 1962), author, journalist
 Bob Broeg (1918–2005), St. Louis sportswriter
 Joe Buck (born 1969), sportscaster for Fox Sports
 Harry Caray (1914–1998), Hall of Fame baseball broadcaster
 Walter Cronkite (1916–2009), television journalist
 Walker Evans (1903–1975), photojournalist best known for photos taken during the Great Depression
 Clay Felker (1925–2008), editor, journalist, founder of New York magazine
 Joe Garagiola, Sr. (1926–2016), MLB catcher, baseball broadcaster, and television host (The Today Show)
 Dave Garroway (1913–1982), first host of NBC's Today show
 Jane Grant (1892–1972), journalist, co-founder of The New Yorker
 Michael Kim (born 1964), sports broadcaster for ESPN
 Carol Platt Liebau, attorney, political analyst and social conservative commentator
 Mary Margaret McBride (1899–1976), female radio pioneer
 Joe McGuff (1926–2006), Kansas City sportswriter
 Dan McLaughlin (born 1974), sportscaster for Fox Sports Midwest
 Russ Mitchell (born 1960), TV journalist, CBS Evening News
 Lisa Myers (born 1951), TV journalist, NBC Nightly News
 Stone Phillips (born 1954), TV journalist, Dateline NBC
 Joseph Pulitzer (1847–1911), Hungarian journalist, creator of the St. Louis Post-Dispatch and the Pulitzer Prize
 Howard Rushmore (1913–1958), journalist for The Daily Worker, New York Journal-American and Confidential magazine
 Elaine Viets, St. Louis columnist and author

Military

 William T. Anderson (1838–1864), a.k.a. "Bloody Bill" Anderson; Confederate guerrilla leader in the Civil War
 Charles D. Barger (1892–1936), earned the Medal of Honor in World War I
 John L. Barkley (1895–1966), earned the Medal of Honor in World War I
 Frederick Benteen (1834–1898), best known for the role under George Custer at the Battle of the Little Bighorn
 Omar Bradley (1893–1981), World War II general, from Clark, Missouri
 Robert Coontz (1864–1935), US Navy Admiral, former Chief of Naval Operations
 John V. Cox (born 1930), United States Marine Corps Major General; flew over 200 combat missions during the Vietnam War
 Enoch Crowder (1859–1932), US Army General and reformer of the military justice system
 Randall "Duke" Cunningham, only U.S. Navy Ace in the Vietnam War; later a U.S. Congressman from California
 James Phillip Fleming (born 1943), USAF pilot; awarded the Medal of Honor for actions during the Vietnam War
 John C. Frémont (1813–1890), Western explorer; Union Civil War general; first Republican candidate for U.S. President
 Frederick Dent Grant (1850–1912), U.S. Army major general and diplomat; son of U.S. President Ulysses S. Grant
 Martin E. Green (1815–1863), Confederate Army brigadier general; killed at Siege of Vicksburg
 John McNeil (1813–1891), Union Army brigadier general during the American Civil War; known as "The Butcher of Palmyra"
 Wayne E. Meyer (1926–2009), U.S. Navy rear admiral; "father of the Aegis weapons system"
 David Moore (1817–1893), Mexican–American War officer and Union Civil War Brigadier General
 Edward O'Hare (1914–1943), "Butch" O'Hare, U.S. Navy Medal of Honor recipient, namesake of Chicago's O'Hare International Airport
 John Henry Parker (1866–1942), "Gatling Gun Parker"; a hero in the Spanish–American War; only U.S. soldier to be awarded the Distinguished Service Cross four times in World War I
 Floyd B. Parks (1911–1942), U.S. Marine aviator who earned the Navy Cross posthumously for his actions leading Marine fighter squadron VMF-221 during the Battle of Midway
 John J. Pershing (1860–1948), soldier, General of the Armies; born in Laclede, Missouri
 Sterling Price, Confederate States Army, General of the Missouri State Guard during the Civil War
 William Quantrill (1837–1865), Confederate guerrilla leader (Quantrill's Raiders) in the Civil War
 John H. Quick (1870–1922), U.S. Marine awarded the Medal of Honor in the Spanish–American War, awarded the Distinguished Service Cross and the Navy Cross in World War I
 James E. Rieger (1874–1951), Colonel Missouri National Guard; awarded Distinguished Service Cross and Croix de Guerre in World War I
 Roscoe Robinson, U.S. Army General
 Jared Schmitz, USMC Lance Cpl.; one of 13 of the last military members to be killed in the War on Terror extraction from Afghanistan 
 Maxwell D. Taylor (1901–1987), U.S. Army general, Chairman of the Joint Chiefs of Staff
 Stephen W. Thompson (1894–1977), first U.S. military pilot to ever shoot down an enemy in aerial combat (1918)
 Harry H. Vaughan (1893–1981), U.S. Army Reserve general, Aide to the President of the United States from 1945 to 1953
 George Allison Whiteman (1919–1941), first United States Army Air Corps pilot killed in World War II; awarded the Silver Star posthumously for after being shot down in the Japanese attack on Pearl Harbor
 Arthur L. Willard (1870–1935), United States Navy Vice Admiral, winner of Navy Cross, French Legion of Honour, and Belgian Order of Leopold; first man to plant the American flag on Cuban soil in the Spanish–American War

Public office

A–K

 Orland K. Armstrong (1893–1987), U.S. Representative, journalist and social activist
 John Ashcroft (born 1942), governor of Missouri (1985–1993), U.S. Senator from Missouri (1995–2001), United States Attorney General (2001–2005)
Rex Barnett (born 1938), politician, and former officer of the Missouri State Highway Patrol
 Thomas Hart Benton (1782–1858), U.S. Senator
 Richard P. Bland (1835–1899), U.S. Representative for 23 years, Democratic candidate for U.S. president in 1896
 Roy Blunt (born 1950), seven-term U.S. Representative for Missouri's 7th congressional district; House Minority Whip, U.S. Senator
 Christopher S. "Kit" Bond (born 1939), governor, U.S. Senator of Missouri
 Leonard Boswell (1934–2018), U.S. Representative for Iowa's 3rd congressional district
 Bill Bradley (born 1943), U.S. Senator for New Jersey, NBA Hall of Famer; born and reared in Missouri
 Karilyn Brown (born c. 1947), member of the Arkansas House of Representatives for Pulaski County; born in Cape Girardeau
 Clarence Cannon (1879–1964), U.S. Representative 1923–1964, House Appropriations Committee chairman
 Albert Sidney Johnson Carnahan (1897–1968), U.S. Representative, US Ambassador to Sierra Leone; father of Governor Mel Carnahan
 Jean Carnahan (born 1933), first Missouri woman to become a U.S. Senator, matriarch of Carnahan political family
 Mel Carnahan (1924–2000), governor, posthumous U.S. Senator (died in plane crash three weeks before he was elected), patriarch of Carnahan political family
 Robin Carnahan (born 1961), Missouri Secretary of State
 Russ Carnahan (born 1958), U.S. House of Representatives
 Francis M. Cockrell (1834–1915) U.S. Senator and general in the Confederate States Army
 Steven Chu (born 1948), U.S. Secretary of Energy
 John Danforth (born 1936), U.S. Senator and United States Ambassador to the United Nations
 Thomas Eagleton (1929–2007), U.S. Senator from Missouri (1968–1987); 1972 Democratic Vice Presidential nominee
 Josh Earnest (born 1977), White House Press Secretary to President Barack Obama
 David R. Francis (1850–1927), U.S. Secretary of the Interior (1896–1897), U.S. Ambassador to Russia (1916–1917)
 J. William Fulbright (1905–1995), U.S. Senator, established the Fulbright Fellowships
 Dick Gephardt (born 1941), U.S. Representative from Missouri's 3rd congressional district (1977–2005); Democratic House Majority Leader (1989–1995); candidate for the Democratic nomination for president in the 2004 election
 Michael Gerson (born 1964), chief speechwriter for George W. Bush (2001–2006)
 Ulysses S. Grant, (1822–1885), 18th President of the United States 
 Michael Harrington (1928–1989), founder Democratic Socialists of America
 George Hearst (1820–1891), U.S. Senator for California (1887–1891)
 Martin Heinrich (born 1971), former Congressman and current U.S. Senator from New Mexico
 Arthur M. Hyde (1877–1947), U.S. Secretary of Agriculture 1929–33, Governor of Missouri 1921–25
 Alphonso Jackson (born 1945), 13th U.S. Secretary of Housing and Urban Development
 James Jones (born 1943), U.S. National Security Advisor under Barack Obama and retired USMC four-star general
 Tim Kaine (born 1958), former Governor and current U.S. Senator from Virginia since 2013; 2016 Democratic nominee for vice president under Hillary Clinton

L–Z

 Jerry Litton (1937–1976), two-term U.S. Representative; Democratic nominee for U.S. Senate in 1976; killed in plane crash before general election
 Breckinridge Long (1881–1958), U.S. Ambassador to Italy and Assistant United States Secretary of State under President Franklin D. Roosevelt
 Claire McCaskill, State Auditor of Missouri (1999–2007); U.S. Senator (2007–2019); first woman elected U.S. senator from Missouri
 James Benton Parsons (1911–1993), federal judge
 Clarke Reed (born 1928), Mississippi Republican state chairman, 1966 to 1976; instrumental in the nomination of Gerald R. Ford Jr. at the 1976 Republican National Convention; reared in Caruthersville, Missouri, and attended the University of Missouri
 Nellie Tayloe Ross (1876–1977), governor of Wyoming (1925–1927); director of the United States Mint (1933–1953); first woman to serve as a state governor
 Mel Sembler (born 1930), U.S. Ambassador to Italy (2001–2005) and Australia (1989–1993)
 Jeanne Shaheen (born 1947), U.S. Senator for New Hampshire
 Ike Skelton (1931–2013), U.S. Congressman for the Missouri 4th District (1977–2011), chairman U.S. House Armed Services Committee
 Stuart Symington, first Air Force Secretary and U.S. Senator from Missouri
 Larry Thompson (born 1945), United States Deputy Attorney General under George W. Bush
 Harry S. Truman (1884–1972), vice president and 33rd President of the United States
 George Turner (1850–1932), U.S. Senator and international arbitrator
 David King Udall (1851–1938), served in Arizona Legislature, progenitor of the Udall political family
 Harold Volkmer (1931–2011), 20-year member of U.S. House of Representatives for northeast Missouri
 Jim Webb (born 1946), U.S. Senator for Virginia and United States Secretary of the Navy
 Charles A. Williams Jr. (born 1950), Assistant Secretary of the United States Navy (2020-2021), U.S. Navy Rear Admiral, Ret. (2005)
 Pete Wilson (born 1933), mayor of San Diego, 36th Governor of California, U.S. Senator (1983–1991)
 Robert Coldwell Wood (1923–2005), Secretary of Housing and Urban Development under Lyndon B. Johnson

Science and medicine

 Augie Auer (1940–2007), atmospheric scientist and meteorologist
 William F. Baker (born 1953), structural engineer
 Jean Bartik (1924–2011), early computer programmer and designer
 Gordon Bell (born 1934), computer engineer and microcomputer pioneer
 Herbert Blumer (1900–1987), sociologist, developer of symbolic interactionism
 Martin Stanislaus Brennan (1845–1927), scientist and priest
 George Washington Carver (c. 1864–1943), botanist
 Steven Chu (born 1948), Nobel Laureate in Physics, U.S. Secretary of Energy
 Robert H. Dicke (1916–1997), astronomer and physicist
 Charles Stark Draper (1901–1987), inventor
 David F. Duncan (born 1947), psychologist and epidemiologist
 James P. Eisenstein (born 1952), physicist
 Meta Given (1888–1981), home economist scientist, dietician, author
 Edward T. Hall (1914–2009), anthropologist and cross-cultural researcher
 Edwin Hubble (1889–1953), astronomer
 Mark Johnson (born 1949), philosopher
 John Johnson (astronomer) (born 1977), astronomer and physicist
 Virginia Eshelman Johnson (1925–2013), psychology researcher
 Jack Kilby (1923–2005), inventor of the integrated circuit, Nobel Prize winner
 Roger Kornberg (born 1947), biochemist, Nobel Prize winner
 Harry Laughlin (1880–1943), eugenicist
 J. C. R. Licklider (1915–1990), psychologist, computer scientist
 Pauline Gracia Beery Mack (1891–1974), chemist
 Ernest Manheim (1900–2002), sociologist
 William Howell Masters (1915–2001), gynecologist
 Orval Hobart Mowrer (1907–1982), psychologist
 Michael Rosbash (born 1944), Nobel Prize in Physiology or Medicine
 Keith Schwab (born 1968), physicist
 Richard Smalley (1943–2005), Nobel Prize-winning chemist, discovered buckminsterfullerene
 Harlow Shapley (1885–1972), astronomer
 William Jasper Spillman (1863–1931), plant geneticist, a founder of agricultural economics
 Lewis Stadler (1896–1954), aka L.J. Stadler, maize geneticist
 Andrew Taylor Still (1828–1917), physician and founder of osteopathic medicine
 Thomas H. Stix (1924–2001), plasma physicist
 Norbert Wiener (1894–1964), mathematician

Miscellaneous famous Missourians

 William Becknell (1787–1856), soldier, businessman, founder of the Santa Fe Trail
 Johnny Behan (1844–1912), sheriff of Tombstone, Arizona, during the gunfight at the O.K. Corral
 Susan Blow (1843–1916), educator, "the mother of kindergarten"
 Sylvia Browne (1936–2013), author who claimed to be a medium and to have psychic abilities
 Nelle G. Burger (1869–1957), president for 34 years of the Missouri State Woman's Christian Temperance Union
 Calamity Jane (c. 1852–1903), Indian fighter and frontierswoman
 Alfred Caldwell (1903–1998), architect 
 Dale Carnegie (1888–1955), public and motivational speaker
 Mike Caro (born 1944), professional poker player
 James E. Cofer (born 1949), president of Missouri State University, 2010–2011; professor of business at MSU
 Brad Daugherty (born 1951), professional poker player
 Moses Dickson (1824–1901), African-American abolitionist, soldier, minister and founder of the secret organization the Knights of Liberty
 Matt Dillahunty (born 1969), public speaker, internet personality, atheist activist
 Timothy M. Dolan (born 1950), Cardinal of the Roman Catholic Church and Archbishop of New York
 Ella Ewing (1872–1913), "The Missouri Giantess", world's tallest woman (of her era)
 Hugh Ferriss (1889–1962), delineator and architect
 Julia Greeley (c. 1833–1918), ex-slave, Roman Catholic candidate for canonization
 Bobby Greenlease (1947–1953), kidnap-murder victim in case that drew national attention
 Phoebe Hearst (1842–1919), philanthropist, feminist and suffragist
 Raelynn Hillhouse, national security and intelligence community analyst, Cold War smuggler, spy novelist
 Helen Viola Jackson (1919–2020); last living wife of a Civil War Veteran
 Frances C. Jenkins (1826–1915), evangelist, Quaker minister, and social reformer
 Mary Ranken Jordan (1869–1962), philanthropist and community advocate
 Terry Karl (born 1947), professor of Latin American Studies at Stanford University
 Emmett Kelly (1898–1979), circus clown
 Karlie Kloss (born 1992), model and ballet dancer
 Alice Moyer Wing (1866–1937), American writer and suffragist
 Carrie Nation (1846–1911), advocate for the temperance movement
 Rose O'Neill (1874–1944), author, illustrator and creator of the Kewpie doll
 Walter J. Ong (1912–2003), Jesuit priest, cultural and religious historian and philosopher
 Phyllis Schlafly (1924–2016), conservative political activist and author
 Dred Scott, slave and litigant in U.S. Supreme Court Dred Scott decision
 George Thampy (born 1987), Scripps National Spelling Bee champion 2000, staff member 2006
 Conrad Tillard (born 1964), politician, Baptist minister, radio host, author, and activist
 Faye Wattleton (born 1943), feminist activist
 Brian Wesbury (born 1958), economist
 Halbert White (1950–2012), economics professor at UC San Diego
 Roy Wilkins (1901–1981), civil rights activist

See also

 List of Hall of Famous Missourians inductees
 List of Missouri suffragists
 List of people from Columbia, Missouri
 List of people from Kansas City, Missouri
 List of people from Sedalia, Missouri
 List of people from Springfield, Missouri
 List of people from St. Joseph, Missouri
 List of people from St. Louis
 Lists of Americans
 Missouri Wall of Fame

References